Semicompatibilism is the view that causal determinism is compatible with moral responsibility, while making no assertions about the truth of determinism or free will. The term was coined by John Martin Fischer.
Prominent semicompatibilists include Sam Harris, and Harry Frankfurt.

Criticisms of this view include the principle of alternative possibilities.

See also
Compatibilism

References

Free will
Normative ethics